Richard Lyons is an American poet and teacher.

Life
He graduated from the University of Massachusetts Amherst, from the University of Arizona with an M.F.A. in Creative Writing (1976–1979), and from the University of Houston with a Ph.D. in English/Creative Writing (1984–1991).

During 1979 and 1980, he taught at the University of Maryland, then at Rhodes College.  He teaches in the English Department at Mississippi State University in Starkville, Mississippi, since 1994.

His work appeared in The Nation, Poetry, The New Republic, The Paris Review, and The North American Review.

Awards
 YHMA/The Nation "Discovery" Award for Poetry in 1984
 Stele Ehrhardt Memorial and Culled Fellowship from the University of Houston in 1984
 Alan Cooling Scholarship in Poetry from the Broadleaf Writers' Conference in 1986
 Criterion Fellowship from Imprint, Inc., in 1987
 Peter I. B. Lavan Younger Poets Award from the Academy of American Poets in 1992.
 1988 Devins Award winner, selected by Deborah Digges, for These Modern Nights
 2000 James Dickey Contemporary Poets Series, selected by Richard Howard, for Hours of the Cardinal
 2005 Washington prize, for Fleur Carnivore

Works
 
 
 Fleur Carnivore, The Word Works (January 1, 2006) 
 Granite from Sugar Water

References

External links
 Author's website

American male poets
University of Massachusetts Amherst alumni
University of Houston alumni
University of Arizona alumni
University of Maryland, College Park faculty
Mississippi State University faculty
Rhodes College faculty
Living people
Year of birth missing (living people)